{{Infobox film
|name = The Lost City
|image = The Lost City film.jpg
|caption = Theatrical release poster
|director = Andy García
|writer = G. Cabrera Infante
|starring = Andy GarcíaDustin HoffmanBill MurrayInés SastreTomás Milián
|producer = Andy GarcíaFrank Mancuso, Jr.
|music = Andy García
|cinematography  = Emmanuel Kaddsh
|editing = Christopher Cibelli
|studio = CineSon
|distributor = Magnolia PicturesCrescent Drive Pictures
|budget = $9.6 million
|gross = $4.4 million<ref>The Lost City (2006) Box Office Mojo Retrieved 2018</ref>
|released = 
|country = United States
|runtime = 144 minutes
|language = EnglishSpanish
}}The Lost City is a 2005 American drama film directed by Andy García. It stars García, Dustin Hoffman, Inés Sastre, and Bill Murray.

Plot

Fico Fellove is the owner of El Trópico, a swank nightclub in Cuba in 1958. He lives for his family and his music, while facing the harsh realities of Batista's dictatorial regime. His brother Ricardo becomes a revolutionary for Castro's rebel army, his brother Luis joins the student opposition, and his father Federico, a well-respected university professor, pushes for change by constitutional, peaceful means.

When Ricardo is arrested and threatened with execution, Fico calls upon an old prep school friend Castel, now a police captain, for help. Ricardo is released from jail, and Fico offers to help him go to Miami or New York City, but he instead joins a rebel column headed by Che Guevara.

Fico is approached by Meyer Lansky, of New York's Genovese crime family, who wishes to open up a gambling room at El Tropico. As he intends for his club to remain a place of music, he turns down the offer. When a bomb later explodes at the club, killing Fico's star entertainer (who is also his lover), Fico assumes that Lansky is behind it. However, in the increasingly unsettled climate, he cannot be certain.

Luis becomes connected with a plot to seize the presidential palace, kill Batista, and restore democracy. The plot fails and most of the attackers are killed. Luis escapes but is killed later by Batista's secret police. At the urging of his mother, Fico tries to cheer up Luis’ distraught widow AuroraFico and Aurora fall in love.

Castro's rebels seize power after Batista flees the country. Fidel Castro declares there will be no elections and Che Guevara oversees the arrests and summary execution of all those who supported the Batista regime. Among those to be executed is Captain Castel. Fico asks Ricardo, now a high-ranking officer in the new regime, to return the favor that Castel once carried out to save Ricardo's life, but Ricardo does nothing to save him.

Ricardo visits his uncle Donoso, a tobacco farmer and cigar maker. Donoso feels that while Castro may be in power now, “the land endures” and says that the farm will next pass to him. Ricardo announces that the reason for his visit is to appropriate the farm for the state. Donoso, furious, has a heart attack and dies. Ricardo, overcome by grief, commits suicide shortly after the funeral.

The revolution affects Fico in other ways as it takes a communist direction. The musicians' union, controlled by Castro, has declared the saxophone to be an imperialist instrument and forbids its use. The club is eventually shut down on a flimsy pretext. After a chance meeting with Castro, Aurora is declared Revolutionary Widow of the Year. She begins to work for the State, and ends her relationship with Fico.

Fico's parents beg him to leave Cuba and start a new family. Reluctantly, he procures exit visas for himself and Aurora. In a last effort to convince her to join him, Fico barges in on a reception for revolutionary leaders and Soviet Bloc ambassadors, but Aurora refuses to go. He raises a toast to a democratic Cuba, then leaves the reception. Fico says his goodbyes to his parents and goes to the airport, where most of his money and possessionsincluding a prized family pocket watch from his fatherare confiscated.

Fico begins a new life in New York. Working as a dishwasher and piano player at a Cuban club, he hopes to save enough money to bring his family to America. Meyer Lansky approaches him with an offer of a Cuban nightclub in Las Vegas, but Fico turns him down. He runs into Aurora, who is in New York as part of a Cuban delegation to the United Nations. He now realizes that she is like Cuba: beautiful, alluring, but also damaged and unattainable. He decides now that his cause is to build a new life until he can return to the city he lost. Fico recites a poem by Cuban nationalist Father José Martí and commits himself to someday returning to his "lost city". He later opens a new nightclub in New York.

Cast
Andy García as Fico Fellove
Inés Sastre as Aurora Fellove
Tomas Milian as Don Federico Fellove
Millie Perkins as Doña Cecilia Fellove
Richard Bradford as Don Donoso Fellove
Nestor Carbonell as Luis Fellove
Enrique Murciano as Ricardo Fellove
Dustin Hoffman as Meyer Lansky
Bill Murray as The Writer
Jsu Garcia as Che Guevara
Juan Fernández de Alarcón as President Fulgencio Batista
Elizabeth Peña as Miliciana Muñoz

Depictions
Che Guevara
In one scene of the film actor Jsu Garcia as Che Guevara is shown after an ambush casually shooting a wounded Fulgencio Batista soldier where he lies. Later in the film the Guevara character asks Andy García's character why he "bothers with such scum", in reference to a former Batista officer who was executed that morning.

Bill Murray as "The Writer"
Bill Murray appeared in the movie as the character of "the Writer". He shows up early in the movie asking Fico for a job, and hovers around Fico, commenting on the absurdities of life, though never playing a clear part in those absurdities. According to the “making of” video, the role is similar to that of a Greek chorus and is really the personality of the movie's author G. Cabrera Infante. Again, according to the making-of video, Murray was given some latitude in improvising dialogue – the scene toward the end where Murray and Hoffman (as Meyer Lansky) discuss egg creams was almost entirely improvised.

Location
The movie was filmed in various locations in the Dominican Republic due to similarity of landscape, vegetation and architecture. The palace scenes were filmed at the Dominican National Palace and the tobacco estate is that of Arturo Fuente.

Critical response
The film generally received unfavorable reviews. Rotten Tomatoes' collection of critics gave the film a 25% approval rating, with the stated consensus that "what starts as a promising exercise devolves into an overlong, unevenly directed disappointment."

Michael Atkinson of The Village Voice critiqued the historical validity of the film, stating "García's tale bemoans the loss of easy wealth for a precious few. Poor people are absolutely absent; García and Infante seem to have thought that peasant revolutions happen for no particular reason—or at least no reason the moneyed 1 percent should have to worry about." Stephen Holden of The New York Times'' described the political dialogue in the film as "strictly of the junior high school variety" while opining that the "characters pontificate in generalities and aphorisms" making them "little more than stick figures with cartoon balloons pasted over their heads."

See also
List of American films of 2005

References

External links
The Lost City Official site

2005 films
American political drama films
2000s political drama films
Films set in 1958
Films set in Havana
Films shot in the Dominican Republic
Films about the American Mafia
Films about Jewish-American organized crime
Lionsgate films
Magnolia Pictures films
Cultural depictions of Meyer Lansky
Cultural depictions of Che Guevara
2005 drama films
2000s American films